Letepsammia is a genus of corals belonging to the family Micrabaciidae.

The species of this genus are found in Pacific and Indian Ocean.

Species:

Letepsammia fissilis 
Letepsammia formosissima 
Letepsammia franki 
Letepsammia superstes

References

Scleractinia genera
Micrabaciidae